KRT may stand for:
 Kanawha Valley Regional Transportation Authority, West Virginia, US
 Kashima Rinkai Railway, Japan
 Khartoum International Airport, IATA code
 Radio Tokyo, later Tokyo Broadcasting System, Japan

See also
 KRTV
 KRT TV